Min Maw Kun (born 26 February 1979) is a Myanmar Academy Award winning film actor and singer in Myanmar.

Early life
Min Maw Kun was born on 26 February 1979 in Yangon to Zin Wine and Khin Nwe Nwe Tun.

Career
He started acting since he was a childhood in 17-year-old. His first film was A Yaite .

Political activities
Following the 2021 Myanmar coup d'état, Min Maw Kun was active in the anti-coup movement both in person at rallies and through social media. Denouncing the military coup, he has taken part in protests since February. He joined the "We Want Justice" three-finger salute movement. The movement was launched on social media, and many celebrities have joined the movement.

On 2 April 2021, warrants for his arrest were issued under section 505 (a) of the Myanmar Penal Code by the State Administration Council for speaking out against the military coup. Along with several other celebrities, he was charged with calling for participation in the Civil Disobedience Movement (CDM) and damaging the state's ability to govern, with supporting the Committee Representing Pyidaungsu Hluttaw, and with generally inciting the people to disturb the peace and stability of the nation.

Awards and nominations

References

External links 
 

Burmese male film actors
Living people
1979 births
People from Yangon